The 1995 Texas A&M Aggies football team completed the season with a 9–3 record.  The Aggies had a regular season Southwest Conference record of 5–2.

1995 was the final year of the Southwest Conference. At the end of the season A&M, along with Texas Tech, Baylor, and Texas, would combine with the members of the Big 8 Conference to form the Big 12 Conference, which began play in 1996.

Schedule

Personnel

Rankings

Game summaries

LSU

Tulsa

Colorado

Texas Tech

SMU

Baylor

Houston

Rice

Middle Tennessee

TCU

Texas

Michigan

References

Texas AandM
Texas A&M Aggies football seasons
Alamo Bowl champion seasons
Texas AandM Aggies football